Barbados competed at the 1988 Summer Olympics in Seoul, South Korea. Seventeen competitors, sixteen men and one woman, took part in twenty events in seven sports.

Competitors
The following is the list of number of competitors in the Games.

Athletics

Men's 4 × 400 m Relay 
 Seibert Straughn, Richard Louis, Allan Ince, and Elvis Forde
 Heat — 3:06.03 
 Semi Final — 3:06.93 (→ did not advance)
Henrico Atkins
Yolande Straughn

Boxing

Gregory Griffith
Sean Knight

Cycling

Two male cyclists represented Barbados in 1988.

Men's sprint
 Vincent Lynch

Men's 1 km time trial
 Roderick Chase

Men's points race
 Roderick Chase

Judo

James Waithe

Sailing

Howard Palmer
Brian Talma
Michael Green
Shane Atwell

Swimming

Men's 50m Freestyle
 Paul Yelle
 Heat – 25.15 (→ did not advance, 49th place)

Men's 100m Freestyle
 Paul Yelle
 Heat – 55.35 (→ did not advance, 61st place)

Men's 100m Butterfly
 Paul Yelle
 Heat – 57.36 (→ did not advance, 34th place)

References

External links
Official Olympic Reports

Nations at the 1988 Summer Olympics
1988
Olympics